Wings of War is a World War I combat flight simulator developed by Czech studio Silver Wish Games and published by Gathering for Microsoft Windows and Xbox in 2004. The game was a standard wartime flight simulator with the underused setting of World War I. Players assume the role of a Royal Air Force pilot fighting the Luftstreitkräfte in several missions.

Gameplay
After players created a profile, the game offered numerous options and game play modes including Campaign and Instant Action. During the Campaign mode, players could not only pilot single fighter planes but could also jump into bombers and recon planes as well as inside the seat of tail-mounted machine guns during missions. Players could also fight with rival pilots, partake in bonus missions and collect bonus icons to increase their score although some missions were timed.

Reception

The game received "mixed or average reviews" on both platforms according to the review aggregation website Metacritic.

References

External links
 

2004 video games
2K Czech games
Combat flight simulators
Gathering of Developers games
Video games developed in the Czech Republic
Windows games
World War I video games
Xbox games